The Huzoor Palace, also spelled Huzar Palace, is a palace in Porbandar, in the Indian state of Gujarat. It was built by Rana Natwarsinhji, who was the last Maharaja of the Princely State of Porbandar, in the early years of the 20th century, with clear European influences. The palace is now used by the successors of the Maharaja's family who reside in London.

During the Navratri festival people of the town queue up at the palace grounds to pay a nazar or pay respect to the former Maharaja and Maharani of Porbandar.

Location
The palace is situated in the city of Porbandar of the Kathiawar Peninsula in western Gujarat on the Arabian Sea coast at the terminal part of the Marine Drive, facing the sea, spread over a sprawling ground. It is served by air, rail and road services.

History
Huzoor Palace was constructed in early part of the 20th century by Rana Natwarsinhji, who was the last Maharaja of the Princely State of Porbandar. Tourists are prohibited from visiting the palace,
as it is now used by the successors of the Maharaja's family who reside in London.

Presently, the palace seems to be in desolate condition with door taken out and brick walls put in place. It is not open to visitors.

Architecture
The palace was built with a clear European influence, with many wings and a slanting roof. The windows are very large with views of the sea.  The various wings of the palace have front and backyards, and arranged so that they present a natural scenic ambiance surrounded by gardens and fountains. The ornamental porticos in the facade are semi-circular in shape, built with neoclassical columns.

References

Bibliography

Palaces in Gujarat
Rajput architecture
Porbandar
Royal residences in India